LifeWorks, (now TELUS Health) formerly known as Morneau Shepell, is a human resources services and technology company headquartered in Toronto, Ontario, Canada. Established in 1966, Morneau Shepell serves approximately 24,000 clients in North America. Besides North American offices, Morneau Shepell also has offices outside North American, including Brazil, Australia and the United Kingdom. Until its acquisition by Telus, LifeWorks was a publicly traded company on the Toronto Stock Exchange (TSX: MSI), with market capitalization of $2 billion.

History 
In 1966, Frank Morneau founded W. F. Morneau & Associates, an actuarial and benefit consulting firm.  The firm expanded to open its first U.S. office in 1987 and it launched its administrative outsourcing practice in 1996.

W.F. Morneau & Associates merged with Sobeco in 1997 to establish Morneau Sobeco, led by Bill Morneau as president and chief executive officer. Morneau Shepell, as it was formerly known, was formed in May 2008 through Morneau Sobeco's acquisition of Shepell-fgi – Canada's largest provider of employee health management and workplace training and education services – from Clairvest Group Inc. for $321.9 million.

In the years since, Morneau Shepell has made a number of acquisitions, including SBC Systems Company Inc. (U.S. provider of employee benefits administration systems) in January 2012, Mercer Canada's pension and benefits outsourcing business in November 2012, Ceridian's U.S. health and welfare benefits administration business in August 2015, Montreal-based Solareh (national health and wellness services provider that offers employee assistance programs) in December 2016, Montreal-based Longpré (employee assistance and wellness program provider) in January 2017, LifeWorks (platform focused on EAP, employee engagement, rewards and recognition, and human resources communications) in July 2018 and Mercer’s stand-alone, large market, health and defined benefit pension plan administration business in the United States.

In March 2017, Morneau Shepell announced Alan Torrie's retirement from the company and Stephen Liptrap as his successor to the position of president and chief executive officer, effective May 5, 2017. In September 2022, the company was acquired by Telus and its stock was delisted from the Toronto Stock Exchange.

Milestones and acquisitions 

 In 1966 W.F. Morneau & Associates ("Morneau") was established.
 In 1992 Morneau formed a strategic alliance with Coopers & Lybrand. 
 In 1997 W.F. Morneau & Associates and Sobeco merged to form Morneau Sobeco.
 In 1998 Morneau acquired Canadian pension consulting practice of Deloitte & Touche. 
 In 2005 the firm became an income trust: Morneau Sobeco Income Fund (MSIF).
 In 2006 MSIF acquired Heath Benefits Consulting.
 In 2007 MSIF acquired the defined benefit pension business of Cowan Benefits Consulting.
 In 2008 MSIF acquired the actuarial firm of Leong & Associates.
 In 2008 Morneau Sobeco acquired Shepell.fgi.
 In 2011 Morneau Shepell completed the reorganization of Morneau Sobeco Income Fund from an income trust structure into a public corporation named Morneau Shepell.
 On September 30, 2011 Morneau Shepell acquired Jacques Lamarre & Associates and Parcours d’enfant.
 On January 31, 2012 Morneau Shepell acquired SBC Systems.
 On November 1, 2012 Morneau Shepell acquired the Canadian pension and benefits administration practice of Mercer Canada.
 On July 5, 2013 Morneau Shepell acquired Dion Durrell’s workers’ compensation business.
 On September 3, 2013 Morneau Shepell acquired Collage Pediatric Therapy.
 On March 3, 2014 Morneau Shepell acquired Groupe AST from ADP Canada.
 On March 31, 2014 Morneau Shepell acquired Pacific Risk Management Corp.
 On July 7, 2014 Morneau Shepell acquired Blue Balloon Health Services.
 On August 4, 2015 Morneau Shepell acquired the U.S. health and welfare benefits administration business of Ceridian.
 On December 1, 2015 Morneau Shepell acquired Bensinger, Dupont & Associates.
 On December 20, 2016 Morneau Shepell acquired Solareh.
 On January 10, 2017 Morneau Shepell acquired Longpré.
 On November 1, 2017 Morneau Shepell acquired Pro Health Group. 
 On December 1, 2017 Morneau Shepell acquired Chestnut Global Partners. 
 On July 27, 2018 Morneau Shepell acquired LifeWorks.
 On August 7, 2019 Morneau Shepell acquired Mercer’s stand-alone, large market, health and defined benefit pension plan administration business in the United States.
 On September 16, 2019 Morneau Shepell acquired MorningStar Health.
 On May 17, 2021 the company's shareholders voted to change the company's name to LifeWorks.
 In June 2022, the company was bought by Telus Corp., in a deal valued at valued at $2.9 billion including debt.

Corporate social responsibility 
In April 2019, Morneau Shepell published its inaugural corporate social responsibility report. The company implemented a board diversity policy to maintain a minimum of 30 per cent women and 30 per cent men on its board of directors, it joined the 30% Club and it created a diversity and inclusion council in early 2019.

In 2014, Morneau Shepell opened the Morneau Shepell Secondary School for Girls in the Kakuma Refugee Camp, located in northwestern Kenya. In 2016, Morneau Shepell pledged more than $1 million over five years to the school to cover operating costs such as teacher salaries, dorm supplies and security.

Ethics controversy 
Bill Morneau, the former finance minister of Canada, is protected resigned from his position as executive chair of Morneau Shepell in October 2015, but continued to own shares in the company. In October 2017, Mr. Morneau became the subject of intense scrutiny regarding his holdings in the company, including the effectiveness of moving his holdings into a blind trust to assuage any concerns. Allegations were brought forward, since Morneau Shepell stood to benefit if a proposed small business taxation legislation was passed. Critics claimed that Morneau Shepell would benefit if the proposed changes prompted more people to use individual pension plans, a claim which Morneau denied, In December 2017, Morneau Shepell said that individual pension plans account for less than one 25th of one per cent (0.04%) of the firm's revenues.

Mr. Morneau was also criticized for holding shares in Morneau Shepell outside a blind trust, and thus being in a conflict of interest situation with respect to the pension plan changes. In response, Mr. Morneau said that he acted on the recommendation of Conflict of Interest and Ethics Commissioner Mary Dawson, who stated that shares could remain behind a conflict-of-interest screen overseen by the minister's chief of staff, and that a blind trust was not necessary. The Conflict of Interest Act states "that any such assets, irrespective of their value, must be divested by either the establishment of a blind trust or by way of sale at arm's length." Mr. Morneau responded to the controversy by saying that he sold his remaining shares in Morneau Shepell and donated all of the money he's profited as a result of an increase in the value of the shares to charity.

Mr. Morneau claimed that he and his father sold Morneau Shepell shares before the tax change announcement in December 2015, before any potential increase in value would have occurred. Mr. Morneau was reported in the media saying that he sold 680,000 shares for proceeds of $10.1 million before December 7, 2015. Subsequently, Mr. Morneau is said (by whom?) to have sold an additional 320,000 shares on December 17, 2015, for a profit of $4.5 million, which he donated to charity. Mr. Morneau claimed later that his father sold 100,000 shares in Morneau Shepell before the tax change announcement, on November 23, 2015, and 100,000 shares after, on December 3, 2015.

References

External links 

Companies based in Toronto
1966 establishments in Ontario
Companies formerly listed on the Toronto Stock Exchange
2022 mergers and acquisitions